Kalevi Laitinen may refer to:
 Kalevi Laitinen (gymnast)
 Kalevi Laitinen (speed skater)